La sceriffa (The Sheriff) is a 1959 Italian Western comedy in black-and-white, directed by Roberto Bianchi Montero. It stars Italian comedy star Ugo Tognazzi. It was released on 16 August 1959. The film starred several comedians and spawned a number of western comedies which followed.

Plot
A sheriff is killed and his widow (Tina Pica) takes up his job to find the killers.

Cast
Tina Pica as Carmela Esposito, 'la Sceriffa'
Ugo Tognazzi as Colorado Joe
Livio Lorenzon as Jimmy Jesse
Tino Scotti as The Judge
Alberto Sorrentino as Brutto Tempo - the Native American
Anita Todesco as Nuvola Rosa - Brutto Tempo's Daughter
Carlo Pisacane as Nick
Carlo Sposito as Gennarino - aka Gen
Annie Alberti as Connie Dallas
Franco Balducci as Jimmy Jesse's Brother
Stelio Candelli as Bruno Carotenuto 
Elio Crovetto as Jack - the Texan drunk
Tina De Mola as Dolly - the singer
Fanfulla as Ciccio - Sceriffa's assistant

Criticism 
This is an “inconsequential western that tries in vain to poke fun at relevant American genre films; neither entertaining nor funny.” According to the dictionary of international film. The Italian colleagues complain that the film was shot "with little resources and too hasty", although it could have been "more pleasant with more care and attention". Christian Kessler notes that the director's 23rd film is exemplary of "the comedies of the time that attempted to revitalize the already worn-out ways of the local comedy class by adding genre-parodic elements". The film is "reasonably entertaining" despite the non-transferability of the dialect jokes prevalent in the original.

References

External links
 

1950s Italian-language films
1959 films
1950s Western (genre) comedy films
Films directed by Roberto Bianchi Montero
Italian black-and-white films
1959 comedy films
1950s Italian films